Halim Malkoč (12 August 1917 – 8 February 1947) was a Bosniak Imam and SS Obersturmführer in the Waffen-SS division Handschar, and the first Muslim awarded the German Iron Cross during World War II. He received the medal for his involvement in the suppression of the Villefranche-de-Rouergue mutiny of 1943.

Military career
Malkoč was a young Imam in Bosnia when the war broke out. He "had served on active duty as an officer in the Yugoslav army and was a gifted military leader". In 1943 he joined the newly formed Waffen-SS Division "Handschar" and was initially appointed an Imam to the "SS-Gebirgs-Pioneer Bataillion 13". In July he and several other Bosnian ulema were sent to Dresden for an important three week "Imam Training Course" organised by SS Obergruppenführer Gottlob Berger and honorary SS officer Mohammad Amin al-Husayni, the Grand Mufti of Jerusalem. Classes included lessons on "The Waffen-SS: Its Organization and Ranks" and German language training. There were also excursions to the Berlin Opera and the Babelsberg castle, Potsdam and the Nicholaisee.

Villefranche-de-Rouergue
During training, Communist "agents provocateurs" in the Division staged a mutiny on 17 September near Villefranche-de-Rouergue in France in which several SS officers were executed. A German called Dr. Schweiger turned to Malkoč for help.  The Imam eventually persuading the men to surrender and disarm. A report stated, "To complete this task the doctor sought the assistance of Imam Malkoč, who proved to be quite helpful, demanding complete obedience from the troops."

In recognition of his services he was awarded the Iron Cross, second Class, in October 1943. A year later he was appointed Imam for the entire Division after the first appointee, Imam Abdulah Muhasilović, deserted on 21 October 1944.

Death
After the war, the new Communist government in Yugoslavia hanged Malkoč in Bihać on 8 February 1947.

See also
Waffen-SS
Villefranche-de-Rouergue uprising

References

Literature
Lepre, George. Himmler's Bosnian Division: The Waffen-SS Handschar Division 1943-1945. Atlgen, PA: Schiffer Military History, 1997 
Munoz, Antonio J., editor. The East Came West: Muslim, Hindu and Buddhist Volunteers in the German Armed Forces. (chapters 2 and 13) Bayside, NY: Axis Europa, 2001 
Redžić, Enver, “Muslimansko Autonomastvo I 13. SS Divizija". Sarajevo: Svjetlost, 1987.

1917 births
1947 deaths
People from Bihać
Bosniaks of Bosnia and Herzegovina
Bosnia and Herzegovina Muslims
Military history of Bosnia and Herzegovina
Bosnian Muslim collaborators with Nazi Germany
Executed Yugoslav collaborators with Nazi Germany
Nazis executed by Yugoslavia by hanging
Executed Bosnia and Herzegovina people
Recipients of the Iron Cross (1939), 2nd class
Waffen-SS foreign volunteers and conscripts